Ruehssia is a genus of plants in the family Apocynaceae. It is also in the Asclepiadoideae subfamily and Marsdenieae tribe.

Its native range is tropical and subtropical South America. It is found in Argentina (north-eastern and north-western), Belize, Bolivia, Brazil (north, north-eastern, south, south-eastern and west-central), Colombia, Costa Rica, Cuba, Dominican Republic, Ecuador, El Salvador, French Guiana, Guatemala, Guyana, Haiti, Honduras, Jamaica, the Leeward Islands, Mexico (north-eastern, south-eastern and south-western), Nicaragua, Panamá, Paraguay, Peru, Suriname, Trinidad and Tobago, Uruguay, Venezuela and the Windward Islands.

The genus name of Ruehssia is in honour of Carl Andreas Rühsz (1805–1880), the German consul in Puerto Cabello, Venezuela. He was a supporter of art and science. 
It was first described and published in Verh. Vereins Beförd. Gartenbaues Königl. Preuss. Staaten Vol.19 on page 304 in 1849.

Known species
According to Kew;

A recently published Puerto Rican endemic plant species, Ruehssia woodburyana  has not yet been accepted by Kew, it is listed as Critically Endangered (CR), based on Criteria C2a(i)+D, according to the IUCN Red List.

References

Apocynaceae genera
Plants described in 1849
Flora of Mexico
Flora of Central America
Flora of the Caribbean
Flora of northern South America
Flora of western South America
Flora of Brazil
Flora of Northeast Argentina
Flora of Northwest Argentina
Flora of Paraguay
Flora of Uruguay
Asclepiadoideae
Taxa named by Gustav Karl Wilhelm Hermann Karsten